K-type asteroids are relatively uncommon asteroids with a moderately reddish spectrum shortwards of 0.75 μm, and a slight bluish trend longwards of this. They have a low albedo. Their spectrum resembles that of CV and CO meteorites. A larger K type is 9 Metis. 

These asteroids were described as "featureless" S-types in the Tholen classification. The K-type was proposed by J. F. Bell and colleagues in 1988 for bodies having a particularly shallow 1 μm absorption feature, and lacking the 2 μm absorption. These were found during studies of the Eos family of asteroids.

See also
Asteroid spectral types
L-type asteroid
S-type asteroid
X-type asteroid
181 Eucharis
221 Eos
402 Chloë
417 Suevia

References
J. F. Bell A probable asteroidal parent body for the CV and CO chondrites, Meteoritics, Vol. 23, pp. 256 (1988). 
J. F. Bell et al. The 52-color asteroid survey: Final results and interpretation, Lunar and Planetary Science, Vol. 19, pp. 57 (1988).

Asteroid spectral classes